, also known as  was the fourth son to the reputed Mōri Motonari throughout the latter Sengoku Period of Feudal Japan. He has the same biological mother with Amano Motomasa and Kobayakawa Hidekane.

Family
Father: Mōri Motonari (1497–1571)
Mother: Nomi no Ōkata (?-1601)
Brothers:
 Mōri Takamoto (1523–1563)
 Kikkawa Motoharu (1530–1586)
 Kobayakawa Takakage (1533–1597)
 Kobayakawa Hidekane (1567–1601)
Son: Mōri Hidemoto (1579–1650)

Samurai
1551 births
1597 deaths